Friendship Hall is a historic home located at East New Market, Dorchester County, Maryland.  It is a Georgian-style brick dwelling.  It consists of a large five-bay, two-story main block built about 1790; a two-bay one-story passage; and a -story kitchen wing. Also on the property is a tall frame smokehouse with board-and-batten siding and a steep gable roof. It is associated with the locally prominent Sulivane family, who first came to Maryland in 1695.

It was listed on the National Register of Historic Places in 1973.

References

External links

, including photo from 1930, at Maryland Historical Trust
East New Market, A Comprehensive History Online includes a detailed history of Friendship Hall

Houses in Dorchester County, Maryland
Houses on the National Register of Historic Places in Maryland
Houses completed in 1790
Georgian architecture in Maryland
Historic American Buildings Survey in Maryland
National Register of Historic Places in Dorchester County, Maryland